Fernando Primo de Rivera y Sobremonte, 1st Marquess of Estella (24 July 1831 – 23 May 1921) was a Spanish politician and soldier.

Fernando Primo de Rivera was the son of Antonio Hermenegildo Primo de Rivera y Sobremonte and his wife Ana María de Torres Rovellas y Peña Vélez (1811–1865); she was the daughter of Miguel de Torres Rovellas y Peña Vélez, 13th Count of Torres Rovellas, 8th Marquess of Peña Vélez (1764–1851). His grandfather was Bértrand Primo de Rivera (1741–1813): he was a Spanish general under the Spanish Resistance against Napoleon Bonaparte.

He served in several wars, including the 1848 and 1866 Madrid insurrections and the second Carlista War. When forces under his command in the second Carlist War captured Estella, he was named Marquess of Estella. He was the Spanish Governor-General of the Philippines from 1880 to 1883. In 1897, he again became the Spanish Governor-General of the Philippines. He temporarily suspended hostilities in the Philippine Revolution through negotiations with Emilio Aguinaldo in the Pact of Biak-na-Bato and acted briefly as Governor-General of the Philippines. He was a Minister and the 70th Prime Minister of Spain for one day between 30 and 31 December 1874. He was created the 1st Marquess of Estella on 25 May 1877, the 1,124th Knight of the Spanish Order of the Golden Fleece and the 287th Grand Cross of the Royal Order of Our Lady of the Concepcion of Vila Viçosa of Portugal in 1879.

He was married in Sevilla on 18 June 1857 to María del Pilar Arias-Quiroga y Escalera (Sevilla, Alcolea del Río, c. 1835 – 10 May 1894), 745th Dame of the Royal Order of Queen María Luisa, daughter of Juan Arias-Quiroga y Mejías, 7th Marquess of Arias-Quiroga and his wife María Manuela de Escalera y Fernández de Peñaranda, daughter of Roberto de Escalera y Fernandez de Peñarada, 46th Lord of Peñaranda, by whom he had no issue. He was also the uncle of Miguel Primo de Rivera, the Spanish dictator, and granduncle of the founder of the Falange Española, Jose Antonio Primo de Rivera.

References

1831 births
1921 deaths
People from Seville
Spanish captain generals
Spanish generals
Knights of the Golden Fleece
Captains General of the Philippines
Fernando
Spanish military personnel of the Third Carlist War (Governmental faction)